Artak is an Armenian masculine given name. Notable people called Artak include:

Artak Aleksanyan (born 1991), Armenian football player
Artak Dashyan (born 1989), Armenian football player
Artak Davtyan (born 1970), Armenian Major-General, currently 7th Chief of the General Staff of the Armenian Armed Forces
Artak Ghulyan (born 1958), Armenian architect and designer, professor of the International Academy of Architecture
Artak Grigoryan (Armenian footballer) (born 1987), Armenian football midfielder
Artak Harutyunyan (born 1983), Armenian Greco Roman wrestler
Artak Hovhannisyan (born 1993), Armenian Freestyle wrestler
Artak Malumyan, Armenian amateur boxer
Artak Yedigaryan (born 1990), Armenian football player

See also
Artakama
Artakioi
Artoces of Iberia
Artsakh (disambiguation)
Aryktakh
Atak (disambiguation)

Armenian masculine given names